Jalalabad is the fifth-largest city of Afghanistan. Jalalabad is located at the junction of the Kabul River and the Kunar River in a plateau to the south of the Hindu Kush mountains. It is linked by the Kabul-Jalalabad Road to the west and Peshawar in Khyber Pakhtunkhwa, Pakistan, to the east through Torkham and the Khyber Pass.

Major industries include papermaking, as well as agricultural products including oranges, lemon, rice, and sugarcane, helped by its warm climate. It hosts Afghanistan's second largest educational institute, Nangarhar University. For centuries the city has been favored by Afghan kings and it has a cultural significance in Afghan poetry. During Timur Shah's reign of the Durrani Empire, Jalalabad served as the Afghan winter capital.

History

Ancient and medieval
Faxian visited and worshiped the sacred Buddhist sites such as The Shadow of the Buddha in Nagarhara (modern Jalalabad). In 630 AD, Xuan Zang, the famous Chinese Buddhist monk, visited Jalalabad, which he referred to as Adinapur; he also visited a number of other locations nearby. The city was a major center of Greco-Buddhist culture in the past, with sites such as Ahin Posh, until it was conquered by Ghaznavids in the 11th century AD. However, not everyone converted to Islam at that period as some still refused to accept it. In Hudud-al-Alam, written in 982 AD, there is reference to a village near Jalalabad where the local king used to have many Hindu, Muslim and Afghan wives.

The region became part of the Ghaznavid Empire in the 10th century. Sabuktigin annexed the land all the way west of the Neelum River in Kashmir. "The Afghans and Khiljies who resided among the mountains having taken the oath of allegiance to Sabuktigin, many of them were enlisted in his army, after which he returned in triumph to Ghazni." The Ghurids succeeded the Ghaznavids and expanded the Islamic empire further into Hindustan. The region around Jalalabad later became part of the Khalji territory, followed by that of the Timurids.

Modern
It is said that the original name of Jalalabad was Adinapur. Jalalabad was named in honour of Mughal ruler Jalal-uddin in the last decade of the sixteenth century, the grandson of Babur. The modern city gained prominence during the reign of Babur, founder of the Mughal Empire. Babur had chosen the site for this city which was built by his grandson Jalal-uddin Mohammad Akbar in 1560.

It remained part of the Mughal Empire until around 1738 when Nader Shah and his Afsharid forces began defeating the Mughals. Nader Shah's forces were accompanied by the young Ahmad Shah Durrani and his 4,000-strong Afghan army from southern Afghanistan. In 1747, he founded the Durrani Empire (Afghan Empire) after re-conquering the area. The Afghan army has long used the city while going back and forth during their military campaigns into the  Indian-subcontinent. It was under the brief control of the Marathas under Tukojirao Holkar, who defeated Jahan Khan.

The British-Indian forces invaded Jalalabad in 1838, during the First Anglo-Afghan War. In the 1842 Battle of Jellalabad, Akbar Khan besieged the British troops on their way to Jalalabad. In 1878, during the Second Anglo-Afghan War, the British again invaded and set up camps in Jalalabad but withdrew two years later.

Jalalabad is considered one of the most important cities of the Pashtun culture. Seraj-ul-Emarat, the residence of Amir Habibullah and King Amanullah was destroyed in 1929 when Habibullah Kalakani rose to power; the other sanctuaries however, retain vestiges of the past. The mausoleum of both rulers is enclosed by a garden facing Seraj-ul-Emart. The Sulemankhils, a Pashtun family famous for their scientific research, is from Jalalabad. Other celebrated Pashtun families originate from the villages near Jalalabad too.

In the 1960s and 1970s, construction started on a new planned city called Reg-e Shamshad Khan.

From 1978 to early 1990s, the city served as a strategic location for the Soviet-backed Democratic Republic of Afghanistan. In March 1989, two Mujahideen rebel factions backed by Pakistan and the U.S. assaulted the city during the Battle of Jalalabad. However government forces managed to drive them out within two months, which was a major setback to the resistance fighters and the ISI. The city was heavily bombarded and hundreds of civilians were killed. Many buildings, such as schools, hospitals and public buildings were destroyed during the 2-month battle.

After the resignation of President Najibullah, Jalalabad quickly fell to mujahideen rebels of Yunus Khalis on April 19, 1992. On September 12, 1996, the Taliban took control of the city until they were toppled by the US-backed Afghan forces in late 2001. Al-Qaeda had been building terrorist training camps in Jalalabad. The city returned to Afghan government control under Hamid Karzai.

The economy of Jalalabad gradually increased in the last decade. Many of the city's population began joining the Afghan National Security Forces. Construction has also increased. The Jalalabad Airport has long served as a military base for the NATO forces. In 2011, the U.S. Embassy in Kabul announced that it plans to establish a consulate in Jalalabad. In March 2007, US marines murdered 19 unarmed civilians and wounded 50 near Jalalabad, in an incident compared by the New York Times to the Haditha massacre. None of those responsible received any serious punishment. Many suicide attacks by jihadist insurgents have taken place, including in August 2013, April 2015, January 2018, July 2018, September 2018, October 2019 and August 2020. The groups responsible for the attacks include the Taliban, Haqqani Network, al-Qaeda, and ISIS (Daesh).

On August 15, 2021, the Taliban again took control of the city. Its capture cut off the last highway from Kabul to the outside world, and the city fell later the same day. Three days later on August 18, protestors took down the Afghan Taliban flag and replaced it with a tricolor flag of the previous Afghan government.

Demographics 

The city population is estimated to be 280,685 in year 2021. The total number of dwellings in this city is 39,586.

Nearly all residents of Jalalabad are Muslim, followers of Sunni Islam. Jalalabad is also a center of the country's Sikhs, although the community has dwindled in the city (and nationwide) since the wars began. Similarly it is also has a Hindu minority.

Land use 
Jalalabad is the regional hub in eastern Afghanistan, close to the border with Pakistan. Agriculture is the predominant land use at 44%, higher density of dwellings is found in Districts 1–5 and vacant plots are largely clustered in District 6. Districts 1–6 all have a grid network of roads.

Climate 

Jalalabad's climate is hot desert (Köppen: BWh), and it is one of the hottest localities in Afghanistan. The city's climate has close resemblance to that of Arizona in the United States. It receives six to eight inches (152 to 203 mm) of rainfall per annum which are limited to winter and the months of spring. Frosts are not common, and during the summer, the temperature can reach a maximum of 120 °F (49 °C).

The north and southwestern parts of the city which has lower elevation are welcoming places to winds from the north and west cooling the parts in summer months. Jalalabad has the highest relative humidity in summer compared to other Afghan cities. However the moderate temperatures of winter has led to various people down the history establishing their settlements in the city. Because of its warm temperature relative to most of Afghanistan, Jalalabad (alongside Peshawar) was often the "winter capital" of various Afghan rulers of the past centuries, while rich people would relocate to villas in Jalalabad to avoid the freezing temperatures in Kabul.

Flora and fauna
Jalalabad is home to a large number of fruits. Various types of citrus fruits like orange, tangerine, grapefruit, lemon, lime grow in gardens as well as in orchards. The orange trees yield a crop only once in three years. The narindj variety of orange is the most common one which has yellow skin and its taste is a combination of orange and grapefruit. The grapefruits grown here have a diameter of eight or nine inches. Per year 1800 tonnes of pomegranates, 334 tonnes of grapes, and 7750 tonnes of mulberries are produced in Jalalabad. The fruits are either sold in local markets or transported to Kabul markets from where they are exported. The second most common crop is local vatani variety of sugarcane. It contains 15% sugar by weight. Jalalabad also has the largest date farm in Afghanistan.

Transportation 

It is a domestic airport for civilian use. It serves the population of Nangarhar and neighboring provinces.

There are proposals for the establishment of Afghanistan's rail network linking Jalalabad with Pakistan Railways, allowing for increased trade of goods, people and commerce between the two countries.

Jalalabad is connected by main roads with the Afghan capital of Kabul, the city of Peshawar in Khyber Pakhtunkhwa, Pakistan, and several nearby Afghan cities and towns. All trade between Afghanistan and Pakistan passes through this city. The highway between Jalalabad and Kabul was resurfaced in 2006, reducing the transit time between these two important cities. This highway is considered to be one of the most dangerous in the world because of the large number of accidents. An improvement in the road networks between Jalalabad and Peshawar has also been proposed, with the intention of widening the existing road and improving security to attract more tourists and allow for safer passage of goods between to the two countries.

General places of interest 

The people of Jalalabad go there not only for sports purposes but also for enjoyment and relaxation. This is especially during holidays or when they receive visiting family or friends from another place. It is also a popular hangout for those with cars.

Hotels
 Spinghar Hotel
 Sultan Hotel and Restaurant
 White House Hotel
 Mosques
 Akhunzada Mosque
 Spin Mosque
 Parks
 Abdul Haq Park (located next to the city's main stadiums)
 Amir Habibullah Khan Park (across the street from Siraj-ul-Emarat Park)
 Aryan Park (located in the southwestern section of the city)
 Farm Hada Park (located in southern part of the city)
 Siraj-ul-Emarat Park (located next next to House of Governor)
 Mausoleums
 Mausoleum of King Amanullah Khan (Siraj-ul-Emarat Park)
 Mausoleum of Khan Abdul Ghaffar Khan
 Mausoleum of Mohammad Gul Khan Momand
 Hospitals
 Al Shifa Modern Hospital
 Bakhtar Hospital
 Baidara Hospital
 Hassanzai Curative Hospital
 Jalalabad Regional Hospital
 Jalalabad Medical Complex
 Khair-un-Nisa Medical Complex
 Spingha Momand Hospital
 Malalai Curative Hospital
 Nangarhar Teaching Hospital
 Naseri Hospital
 Rokhan Hospital
 Universities
 Alfalah University
 Ariana University
 Khurasan University
 Nangarhar University
 Spinghar Higher Education Centre
 Shopping centers
 Hejaz Super Market
 Jada Super Store
 Nakamura Super Store

Sports

The province is represented in domestic cricket competitions by the Nangarhar province cricket team. National team member Hamid Hasan was born in the province and he currently represents Afghanistan in international cricket. The Ghazi Amanullah International Cricket Stadium is the first international standard cricket stadium in Afghanistan. It is located in the Ghazi Amanullah Town, a modern suburb on the southeastern fringe of Jalalabad in Nangarhar Province. Construction on the stadium began in March 2010 when the foundation stone was laid by Minister of Finance and president of the Afghanistan Cricket Board, Omar Zakhilwal. The project, which was developed on 30 acres of land donated by the developer constructing the Ghazi Amanullah Town, cost up the first phase of construction $1.8 million. The first phase, which took one year to complete, included the completion of the stadium itself. The remainder of the phases will see the construction of a pavilion, accommodation for players and administrative buildings. The stadium, which has a capacity of 14,000, was completed before the national team and under-19 team left for Canada and the Under-19 Cricket World Cup Qualifier in Ireland respectively. The two sides inaugurated the stadium in a Twenty20 match. It is hoped that the stadium will be able to attract international teams to play Afghanistan, who currently have One Day International status until at least 2013.

Professional sports teams from Jalalabad

Stadiums
 Nangarhar Football Stadium (next to Abdul Haq Park and House of Governor)
 Behsud Cricket Stadium (next to Abdul Haq Park and House of Governor)

International sister cities
San Diego, California, United States

Notable people 
 Rashid Khan, cricketer
 Amanullah Khan, Emir and King of Afghanistan (1919–1929), buried in the city
 Abdul Ghaffar Khan, buried in the city
 Mohammad Gul Khan Momand, buried in the city
 Tetsu Nakamura, lived and died in the city

See also 
 List of cities in Afghanistan

References

Further reading

Published in the 19th century

Published in the 20th century

External links 

 

 
Populated places in Nangarhar Province
Populated places along the Silk Road
Buddhism in Afghanistan
History of Nangarhar Province
Populated places established in 1570
Provincial capitals in Afghanistan